Heribert Karches (born 12 November 1958) is a German rower. He competed in the men's coxed four event at the 1984 Summer Olympics.

References

1958 births
Living people
German male rowers
Olympic rowers of West Germany
Rowers at the 1984 Summer Olympics
Sportspeople from Mainz